This is a list of winners and nominees for the BAFTA Award for Best Original Music, formerly known as the Anthony Asquith Award for Film Music, which is presented to film composers, given out by the British Academy of Film and Television Arts since 1968.

With seven wins out of seventeen nominations, John Williams is both the most nominated and most awarded in this category. Ennio Morricone is the only composer to win in consecutive years; for The Mission in 1987 and The Untouchables in 1988. Morricone also has the highest perfect score and record, with six wins from six nominations. George Fenton and Howard Shore share the record of most nominations without a win (six each). Only six composers, John Williams (in 1975 and 1978), Vangelis (in 1982), Maurice Jarre (in 1985), Hans Zimmer (in 2017), and the composing duo Trent Reznor & Atticus Ross (in 2020), have received two nominations in the same year. In 2019, Lady Gaga became the first woman ever to win this award for A Star Is Born. In 2020, Hildur Guðnadóttir became the first woman ever credited for a solo win in this award for Joker.

In 2022, after 10 nominations, Hans Zimmer finally won this award (for Dune); setting the record for most nominations before first award.

Winners and nominees

1960s
 Anthony Asquith Award for Original Film Music

1970s

1980s
 Best Original Film Music

 Best Score for a Film

 Best Original Film Score

1990s

 Anthony Asquith Award for Film Music

2000s

 Best Music

2010s
 Best Original Music

2020s

Multiple nominations and wins

Multiple nominations
This list is incomplete. You can help by expanding it.

The following individuals have been nominated for the award multiple times:

Multiple wins
This list is complete. You can’t help by expanding it.

The following individuals have won the award multiple times:

See also
 Academy Award for Best Original Score
 Critics' Choice Movie Award for Best Score
 Golden Globe Award for Best Original Score
 Grammy Award for Best Score Soundtrack for Visual Media
 Grammy Award for Best Compilation Soundtrack for Visual Media

References

External links
 

British Academy Film Awards
 
Film music awards